Sportovní hala Fortuna is a multi-purpose indoor arena in Prague, Czech Republic, whose naming rights are currently leased to Czech betting company Fortuna. The arena, located on the fairgrounds in Bubeneč in the neighbourhood of Holešovice, opened in 1962 as Sportovní hala and has a capacity of 13,150 for ice hockey games. Until 2015, it was the home arena of Czech Extraliga team HC Sparta Praha and between 2012 and 2014 KHL's team HC Lev Praha.

History
During its existence, the arena has hosted many important sporting events. It hosted the Ice Hockey World Championships four times and for years hosted a prestigious annual figure skating competition. The arena hosted the 1980 Davis Cup final, where Czechoslovakia defeated Italy.

Hundreds of concerts have also been staged at the arena during its history. It was the largest and most important arena in Czechoslovakia and the Czech Republic for over 40 years until the new O2 Arena opened in 2004.

Notable events
 1967 European Indoor Games
 1972 World Ice Hockey Championships
 1978 World Ice Hockey Championships
 Final of the 1980 Davis Cup, 5–7 December 1980
 1981 FIBA European Championship
 1985 World Ice Hockey Championships
 1992 Men's World Ice Hockey Championships
 1993 World Figure Skating Championships
 2007 Czech Open

Gallery

See also
Home Credit Arena (formerly known as Tipsport Arena), in Liberec, Czech Republic
Tipsport arena (Pardubice)

References

External links

Official Website
HC Sparta Praha
Detailed description of Tesla Arena with map and photos
The plan of the Tesla Arena

Sports venues completed in 1962
Indoor arenas in the Czech Republic
Indoor ice hockey venues in the Czech Republic
Sports venues in Prague
Music venues in Prague
Indoor track and field venues
HC Lev Praha
HC Sparta Praha
Kontinental Hockey League venues
1962 establishments in Czechoslovakia
1980 Davis Cup
Prague 7
20th-century architecture in the Czech Republic